Confucius Plaza Apartments is a limited-equity housing cooperative in Chinatown, Manhattan, New York City. The 44-story brown brick tower block complex with 762 apartments was constructed in 1975 at a cost of $38.387 million. The building was the first major public-funded housing project built for almost exclusively Chinese Americans.

Beneath the building's apartments it contains the Yung Wing Public School, P.S. 124 (K-5), shops, community space, and a daycare center. The complex is located north of Chatham Square at the intersection of Bowery, Doyers Street, and Division Street.

One of the most frequently visited landmarks in Chinatown is the 15-foot bronze statue of Confucius, the Chinese philosopher, in front of the complex. Sculpted by Liu Shih, the statue was presented by the Chinese Consolidated Benevolent Association as a token of appreciation, and to commemorate the U.S. bicentennial. At its base, a Confucian proverb is inscribed aside an American Flag, praising a just government with remarkable leaders of wisdom and ability.

During the construction of Confucius Plaza, Asian American activists organized several successful protests alleging discriminatory hiring practices by the contractor, DeMatteis Organization, for refusing to hire Asian construction workers.  On May 16, 1974, a protest of 250 individuals organized by Asian Americans for Equal Employment (now Asian Americans for Equality)  resulted in a work stoppage when protestors entered the construction site. Protestors held signs in English and Chinese which stated “The Asians build the railroad; Why not Confucius Plaza” and “DeMatteis, you are big racist.”  Over 55 people were arrested for trespassing and disorderly conduct.  Several weeks later, DeMatteis agreed to hire 27 minority workers. 

A section of Second Avenue Subway tunnel was built in the 1970s, constructed concurrently with the plaza underneath it, and is lightly graffitied.

References
Notes

External links 
 
 Confucius Plaza Apartments at Emporis Buildings

Condominiums and housing cooperatives in Manhattan
Apartment buildings in New York City
Chinatown, Manhattan
Residential buildings completed in 1975